The South Bend Blue Sox was a women's professional baseball team who played from  through  in the All-American Girls Professional Baseball League. A founding member, the team represented South Bend, Indiana, and played their home games at Bendix Field (1943–1945) and Playland Park (1946–1954).

History

The Blue Sox were one of two teams to play in every AAGPBL season without relocating, the other being the Rockford Peaches. Often a second-division team, they appeared in six playoff series and won two league titles.

In the 1943 inaugural season, The Blue Sox finished in third place with a 51–40 mark, only .001 percentage point behind second place Kenosha Comets. Together, pitchers Margaret Berger and Doris Barr threw 79 of the 91 games played by the Sox. Berger was credited with 25 wins and Barr with 15, while Berger posted her greatest triumph in a 13–inning match, which she won 1–0. 

The next three years, South Bend finished 64–55 (1944), 49–60 (1945), 70–42 (1946), 57–54 (1947) and 57–59 (1948). After falling in their playoff intents, in the 1949 season the team posted the best record in with a 75–36 mark. That year they were swept in the playoffs, 4–to–0, by Rockford, after getting a first-round bye along with them. The South Bend club went on to win their next four playoffs in claiming back-to-back championship titles in 1951 and 1952. After that, the Blue Sox finished in last place both in the 1953 and 1954 seasons.

Apart from the aforementioned Barr and Berger, the South Bend included talented players as Mary Baker (C), Jean Faut (P) Betsy Jochum (OF/1B), Elizabeth Mahon (OF), Betty Whiting (IF), and Dottie Schroeder (SS), who played with four teams to become the only girl to play through the 12 years of existence of the circuit.

All-time roster
Bold denotes members of the inaugural roster

Managers
 Bert Niehoff, 1943-1944  
 Marty McManus, 1945
 Chet Grant, 1946-1947
 Marty McManus, 1948
 Dave Bancroft, 1948-1950
 Karl Winsch, 1951-1954

Sources
 All-American Girls Professional Baseball League Record Book – W. C. Madden. Publisher: McFarland & Company. Format: Paperback, 294pp. Language: English. .

External links
All-American Girls Professional Baseball League

All-American Girls Professional Baseball League teams
1943 establishments in Indiana
1954 disestablishments in Indiana
Baseball teams established in 1943
Baseball teams disestablished in 1954
Sports in South Bend, Indiana
Professional baseball teams in Indiana
Defunct baseball teams in Indiana
Women's sports in Indiana